The overview of recent developments in public art practices in Korea (1999–2005) Public art practices from the last 5 years or so in Korea can be narrowed down to three major issues. The first issue is the dispute over the Art Decoration Law for buildings, which is the national cultural policy that mandates acquisition of public sculptures. The second is proliferation of gigantic-scale public art projects led by local governments. The third issue is new genre public art works that pursue activist ideals and social engagement. In this article, the Flying City and Oasis Project's practices will be mainly discussed based on receiving major attention from the mass media and art field. These three issues not only reflect changes in Korean society but also make up characteristics of Korean public art practices.

Public artwork sites in public spaces 

Public sculpture sites in public spaces take up the majority of Korean public art practices in terms of number. The proliferation and popularity of public sculptures originated from the establishment of the Art Decoration Law for buildings when the Korean government was hosting the Olympic Games in 1988. The law mandates that an owner of a new building must earmark 0.7% of the construction cost to artworks for public view. The increasing level of urban population and the buildings constructed due to urban development resulted in a dramatic increase in the number of public sculptures. However, questions have been raised over the artistic quality over these works, especially because most of the public sculptures remain in modernist style, which was the mainstream at the time the law was first established. Disregarding communication with the public audience, these sculptures function merely as decoration of the spaces. Furthermore, only a handful of artists were repeatedly commissioned and even subcontracted to foundries resulting in more problems in the production and dissemination of public sculptures.

As such, these shortcomings stirred up more heated disputes coinciding with elevated levels of interest in public art, and led to the birth of the Public Art Council established in 2002 that opposes the current policies. The Public Art Council raised questions on the extent that current public art practices have provided artistic satisfaction to the public, who the actual audience is, and how relevant the works are to the lives of residents near the art sites. These issues concerning public good were the foundation of the argument by the Public Art Council demanding to raise the quality of public art. Furthermore, it suggested to the government an alternative policy to create a fund drawn from the building owners’ mandated expense when a new building is built by the Art Decoration Law for Buildings. Then the governing body of the fund would allocate money from the fund for operation in selection of artists, maintenance and conservation of the art works. Now the Korean Ministry of Culture and Tourism is seriously considering the suggestion to establish a new law. In light of the fact that Koreans spend 11.5 billion Korean won a year for Public Art (1997 Survey by Korean Culture and Tourism Policy Institute), the Public Art Association expects that a new policy can provide a larger number of artists with new jobs and other career benefits.

Local government-led public art projects

When civilian government came into power in Korea in the 1990s it introduced the Local Government Act. This made it possible for regional governments to act more freely and independently from the central government. This was followed by speedy development in small local cities. From its establishment local governments understood the importance of cultural projects in promoting the images of their regions and therefore commenced public art projects even though most of these projects turned out to be sculpture gardens. Recently, the direction of local government-led cultural projects has slightly changed towards large-scale public art projects coinciding with nationwide interest in concerns for the environment. The Anyang City Government took the initiative in supporting the Supplementary Space Stone & Water and Saving Our Anyang River Network to co-organize the Anyang River Project, FLOW, which is interconnected with the city's urban development project, environmental improvement project, and beautification plan. At the event, murals were placed along various locations around the Anyang River as the center, photograph exhibitions were posted on billboards, and art objects were presented. In addition, the Anyang city government started a 21 billion Korean won (20 million US dollars) scaled multiyear plan to turn the whole city into an art park. The Anyang Public Art Project has been established in November 2005 as the first annual project.

The Seoul Metropolitan Government also kicked off a project in 2002 that restored the Chunggye River, located between City hall and Shindab, which was formerly covered over with a concrete-covered freeway overpass. The freeway was razed and the project was completed on October 1, 2005 after spending 1.5 trillion Korean won (1.4 billion US dollars) by the city government. This project is one of the steps of the city's long term project to promote a higher quality of life for Seoul residents and to provide better environmentally friendly urban development planning. The inauguration events included performance, concerts, and an exhibition with 50 murals and installations along the river.

New genre public art

It was from around the year 2000 when new genre public art first appeared, emphasizing the site of public art and the collaborative working process with the residents of local communities, building on the foundation of the direct relationship between the local environment and the artwork. As this genre emerged it performed distinct activities in the Korean art field. Korea's new genre of public art has shown aggressive tendencies in its social engagement. Two major artist groups - the urban research group Flying City, and the Oasis Project, are typical examples of art involving these social philosophies in art practices.

First, the urban research group Flying City was formed with Jeon Yongseok, Jang Jongkwan, and Kim Gisoo. They have conducted research on the impact that rapid industrialization has had on the city of Seoul since right after the Korean War. The area along the Chunggye River in particular, is the heart of post-war industrialization as well as the most historical site where they carried out series of public art projects.

Among them, Mental Map (2001–2003) was an investigation of the influence on the unconscious level. Here, the Flying City interviewed the residents in the area and asked them to create a psychological map in addition to drawing future maps of the area in which they would like to live. The Chunggye River is also the area that supported the very foundation of the development of Seoul's industrialization due to its concentration of hardware stores, garment shops, and electronic appliance stores. It is even said that there is no brand of goods in the world that has not been copied and sold along Chunggye-river. People have also been known to say that a space satellite could be assembled because one could collect and buy all the necessary parts sold in this area.

Flying City recently organized the Chunggye Mini Expo Project that introduced machine parts manufacturing stores in the area. In this project they studied the co-relationships between and among stores and then created a diagram to visualize their studies. They also turned the stores into temporary exhibition spaces by displaying actual mockups they created to sell and writing anecdotes about the mockups on their show windows encouraging the audience to visit the stores.

Kyongju Park, who is participating in the exhibition, Publicly Speaking, traveled to six major cities of Korea staging a migrant workers election campaign performance that urged a change of perspectives in the ways people regard 350,000 migrant workers. At the same time, she surveyed Koreans on their reaction to the situation of migrant workers running for government. She also set up an internet broadcasting company for migrant workers.

Jihye Kim's work at her exhibition, Invitation to Pyunghwa New City, presents the story of Pyongtaek city residents threatened with eviction from their homes due to the expansion plans of the Humphrey US military base. This area in Pyongtaek was once known as Daechoo-ri before the base moved in. Together with the town residents who have been living in the area from its time as Daechoo-ri, the artist organized a gathering and sang a Daechoo Boy Scouts anthem to call attention to the era when boys in the city were able to play ball games at the playgrounds which were the former sites that are currently occupied by the U.S. military base.

The Oasis Group
Oasis is the name of an artists’ group created by Kim Kang and Kim Younhoan as well as the name of a squat project. The group introduced the concept of “squatting” to Korea and worked actively with the mission of rejuvenating abandoned or decommissioned buildings. They have been trying to occupy the Korean Federation of Art Organizations (KFAO) building since winter 2004. This building was about 90% complete when construction was suspended and was left unfinished for the past 7 years despite the fact that the KFAO received combined grants of 22 billion Korean won (21.5 million US dollars) from both the ministry of Culture and Tourism and the Korean Culture and Art Foundation (KCAF).

The Oasis Group started to occupy the building by cleaning the site and playing on it, only to be stopped by an army of policemen. Later on, Oasis put on an advertisement announcing that office spaces in the 25 storey-high KFAO building were available for rent on the market and made a call for applicants. Oasis and 400 applicants to the office spaces then organized continuous concerts, exhibitions and performance demonstrations in front of the building requesting permission to use the vacant spaces as studios. Their request resulted in huge media coverage on the lack of accountability in KFAO's mismanagement of the building as well as the two government cultural agencies that never followed up on the grants they provided to the KFAO.

KFAO sued the Oasis Group in court and Kim Younhoan and Byunghwan Lee from the group were fined 500,000 Korean won. Even during the trial process the group organized one-person performances and demonstrations in front of the office of the MCT. Later many art professionals participated in the art demonstrations. The number of participants and the level of attention and interest in this issue grew to unprecedented levels, more than any other project organized by an artist group. The group's activities differentiated themselves by the complexity and diversity in their programming as well as their administrational efficiency during the office space distribution performance. The level of organization and efficiency has been compared to standards executed by larger-scaled NGOs.

However, the Oasis group actually occupied the building for only a few days. More attention should be given to the many art related rallies and cultural demonstrations against the KCAF and MCT that were organized by this group. This has shown their focus on their activities as cultural activism that urged reforms of cultural administration practices. .

Characteristics

The criticism by public art associations on the mismanagement of the Art Decoration Law for buildings, the Oasis group and their criticism of the funding administration practices by the MCT and KCAF, Jihye Kim's Daechoo-ri Project dealing with the right-of-residence issue between the US military base and the native residents, and Kyongju Park's performances on migrant workers eligibility in running for election to government posts, can all be considered as cultural activist work dealing with societal and political issues. They also have in common in their approach to their works sophistication in the level of organization and highly skilled administration and networking abilities.

In terms of members, the majority of these groups participated in the Minjung art movement in the 1980s when democratization of Korea began. For that reason, many people tend to associate the current public art practices with Minjung art. Minjung Art can be categorized as an activist movement committed to exposing the misdeeds committed by dictatorial regimes in power at the time. The work of Minjung Art eventually helped bring into motion changes in Korean social conditions. Arousal of public opinion, for example, seems to be one of their common approaches to successful execution of their projects.

Oasis employed this approach through organizing performances lasting over a month and accompanied by the introduction of an activist measure called squatting. Public art associations held numerous roundtables and symposia on the Art Decoration law to bring attention to the controversy over whether the true ownership of public art pieces lies between owner of the building or the residents of the building and its surrounding areas. Although public art associations must resolve the controversy that their methods could violate the rights of private ownership, their controversy indicates that civil society has come into Korea.

The demand of reform in administrative practices against the government's funding agencies shows that such movements only come from the premise based on the political climate in which the government is forced to remain tuned to public opinion. One of the attributes of Korean public art practices can be stated as the majority of artists who are succeeding the socially engaging spirit of Minjung are now taking contemporary approaches focusing on finding resolutions for current social issues as the country's political climate changes.

Arts in South Korea
South Korea